Dušan Mihajlović (born 30 June 1985) is a Serbian football player who plays for Bežanija.

He played for Proleter Zrenjanin in 2001, then moved to OFK Belgrade in 2003 before moving to FK Bežanija in 2006. He joined FK Čukarički in January 2009.

He was part of the FR Yugoslavia U-17 team at the 2002 UEFA European Under-17 Football Championship.

References

External links
 
 

1985 births
Living people
Sportspeople from Zrenjanin
Serbian footballers
Serbian expatriate footballers
Serbian expatriate sportspeople in Libya
Expatriate footballers in Libya
FK Proleter Zrenjanin players
OFK Beograd players
FK Srem players
FK Bežanija players
FK Čukarički players
FK Sevojno players
FK Sloboda Užice players
FK Bačka 1901 players
FK Banat Zrenjanin players
Serbian First League players
Serbian SuperLiga players
Association football midfielders
Olympic Azzaweya SC players
Libyan Premier League players